Thearthur Readié Washington, (born November 3, 1978), better known by the stage name Theory Hazit is an American Christian hip hop artist from Cincinnati, Ohio.

History
Born as Thearthur Readie Washington IV in Winchester, Clark County, Kentucky on November 3, 1978, to mother Tenecia Jackson and to father Thearthur Readie Washington III.

At the time his debut album was released in 2007, Theory Hazit had relocated to Cincinnati, Ohio. This album, entitled Extra Credit, was released on July 17, 2007 in the United States by Groove Attack Productions. It featured production from Tony Stone and Re:Flex the Architect. A review of Extra Credit written in Relevant compared Theory Hazit to Kanye West and Common as both a producer and an MC. Another review of this album, written by Omar Mouallem for Exclaim!, praised the album's song "I Just Wanna Come Home" for having "lyrics as contagious as its soulful hook." The album was also ranked as the 59th best hip hop album of 2007 by Quentin Huff in PopMatters.

Since then, he has released several additional albums, including Thr3e in 2012. He has also released another album entitled "Fall of the Light Bearer".

Discography 
 Extra Credit (2007)
 Lord Fire (2008)
 Modern Marvels (2010) (with Toni Shift)
 Lord Fire 2 (2010)
 The Rock Is Steady (2011)
 Thr3e (2012)
 Monolith Monster (2013)
 The Fall Of The Lightbearer (2015)
 It's Whatever (2017)
 Ravioli & Beatbox (2017)
 Halftime Slow (2017)
 Bless Your Food (2017)
This Is Damone (2017)
 Uglyface (2017)
 Eye See What You Did There (2017)
 Poor Thing (2017)
 It’s Me, Not You (2017)
 FEELS (2017)
The Soul Chops (2018)
I Love It Down Here (2019)
yall still ain't washin yall hands (2020) (temporarily available)
 The Giraffe Tape (2021)

References

External links 
 Theory Hazit at Bandcamp
 Theory Hazit at Discogs

1978 births
Musicians from Cincinnati
Rappers from Cincinnati
Underground rappers
American performers of Christian hip hop music
Living people
21st-century American rappers